James Lee Burke (born December 5, 1936) is an American author, best known for his Dave Robicheaux series. He has won Edgar Awards for Black Cherry Blues (1990) and Cimarron Rose (1998), and has also been presented with the Grand Master Award from the Mystery Writers of America. The Robicheaux character has been portrayed twice on screen, first by Alec Baldwin (Heaven's Prisoners) and then Tommy Lee Jones (In the Electric Mist).

Wirt Williams, reviewing Burke's first novel, Half of Paradise (1965), in the New York Times, compared his writing to Jean-Paul Sartre and Ernest Hemingway, but concluded "Mr. Burkes' literary forebear is Thomas Hardy."

Burke's 1982 novel, Two for Texas, was made into a 1998 TV movie of the same name. Burke has also written five miscellaneous crime novels (including Two for Texas), two short-story collections, four books starring protagonist Texas attorney Billy Bob Holland, four books starring Billy Bob's cousin Texas sheriff Hackberry Holland, and two books starring Weldon Avery Holland, grandson of legendary Texas lawman Hackberry Holland.

Biography
Burke was born in Houston, Texas, but spent most of his childhood on the Texas-Louisiana Gulf Coast. He attended the University of Louisiana at Lafayette and University of Missouri, receiving  bachelor of arts and  Master of Arts degrees in English literature from the latter.

He worked in a variety of jobs over the years, while books he had written were rejected, and books he had published went out of print. At various times, he worked as a truck driver for the U.S. Forest Service, as a newspaper reporter, as a social worker on Skid Row, Los Angeles, as a land surveyor in Colorado, in the Louisiana State unemployment system, and in the Job Corps in the Daniel Boone National Forest in eastern Kentucky.

He taught at the University of Missouri as a grad student, then at the University of Louisiana, the University of Montana, and Miami-Dade Community College, before settling in Wichita, Kansas to teach at  Wichita State University in 1978.

Personal life
Burke and his wife, Pearl (née Pai Chu), owned a home in Lolo, Montana and in New Iberia, Louisiana. They have four children, including Alafair Burke, a law professor and best-selling crime writer.  Daughter Pamala Burke McDavid died in 2020. Extended family include cousins novelist Elizabeth Nell Dubus and author and actress DeLauné Michel.

Bibliography

Dave Robicheaux
The Neon Rain (1987)
Heaven's Prisoners (1988)
Black Cherry Blues (1989)
A Morning for Flamingos (1990)
A Stained White Radiance (1992)
In the Electric Mist with Confederate Dead (1993)
Dixie City Jam (1994)
Burning Angel (1995)
Cadillac Jukebox (1996)
Sunset Limited (1998)
Purple Cane Road (2000)
Jolie Blon's Bounce (2002)
Last Car to Elysian Fields (2003)
Crusader's Cross (2005)
Pegasus Descending (2006)
The Tin Roof Blowdown (2007)
Swan Peak (2008)
The Glass Rainbow (2010)
Creole Belle (2012)
Light of the World (2013)
Robicheaux (2018)
The New Iberia Blues (2019)
A Private Cathedral (2020)

Billy Bob Holland
Cimarron Rose (1997)
Heartwood (1999)
Bitterroot (2001)
In the Moon of Red Ponies (2004)

Hackberry Holland
Lay Down My Sword and Shield (1971)
Rain Gods (2009)
Feast Day of Fools (2011)

Holland Family Saga
 Wayfaring Stranger (2014)House of the Rising Sun (2015)The Jealous Kind (2016)Another Kind of Eden (2021)Every Cloak Rolled in Blood (2022)

MiscellaneousHalf of Paradise (1965)To The Bright and Shining Sun (1970)Two for Texas (1982)The Lost Get-Back Boogie (1986)White Doves at Morning (2002)

Short-story collectionsThe Convict (1985)Jesus Out to Sea (2007)

Recognition
 1988: Burke was awarded a John Simon Guggenheim Fellowship for Creative Arts in Fiction. Burke received the 2002 Louisiana Writer Award for his enduring contribution to the "literary intellectual heritage of Louisiana." The award was presented by the then-Lieutenant-Governor of Louisiana, Kathleen Blanco, on November 2, 2002, at a ceremony held at the inaugural Louisiana Book Festival in Baton Rouge.
 Burke has been recognized three times by the Mystery Writers of America.
 2009: Burke received the MWA's Grand Master Award. A mystery novelist rarely wins both an Edgar award and a Guggenheim fellowship.

References

External links

 
 
 "The Man Behind Dave Robicheaux", James Lee Burke talks about violence, writing, littering, alcoholism, liberalism, and bestsellers.
Interview with James Lee Burke, Speaking of Mysteries TV Series'' (2001)

1936 births
Living people
20th-century American novelists
American mystery writers
American crime fiction writers
Lamar High School (Houston, Texas) alumni
University of Louisiana at Lafayette alumni
People from Iberia Parish, Louisiana
People from Missoula County, Montana
Novelists from Texas
Novelists from Louisiana
Writers from Missoula, Montana
Edgar Award winners
University of Missouri alumni
21st-century American novelists
American male novelists
20th-century American male writers
21st-century American male writers